This page lists a selection of RC Strasbourg Alsace players who have achieved sufficient notability according to several criteria which are defined below. For a list of all RC Strasbourg players, major or minor, with a Wikipedia article, see Category:RC Strasbourg Alsace players, and for the current first-team squad, see RC Strasbourg Alsace#Current squad.

Notable players for the club 

This is a list of notable footballers  who have played for RC Strasbourg from when the club turned professional in 1933 to the present.  Generally, this means all players that have played 100 or more first-class matches for the club. However, some players who have played fewer matches are also included.  This includes those who have represented their country whilst playing for the club, and players who have set a club playing record, such as goalscoring or transfer fee records.

Players are listed according to the date of their first-team debut for the club.  Appearances are for first-team competitive matches only, including substitute appearances, while wartime and cup matches are excluded.  Players who captained the club for 10 or more games during a season are included.  Statistics are correct as of November 25, 2008.

  Joseph Ndo

Club captains

French internationals 

Below is a list of all RC Strasbourg players who have been capped for France.

Italics: Formed at RC Strasbourg's academy
*: Still active
 World Cup winner

Footnotes

References 
 Racingstub player history
 FFF Player history
 Allez les Bleus player history
 Pierre Perny, Racing 100 ans, 2006, 350 p.

Players
 
Association football player non-biographical articles
Strasbourg Alsace